Lineodes is a genus of snout moths of the subfamily Spilomelinae in the family Crambidae. The genus was described by Achille Guenée in 1854, with Lineodes hieroglyphalis as the type species.

The genus is mostly Neotropical and southern Nearctic in distribution (with the exception of Lineodes longipes, described from Sumatra) and currently comprises 38 species.

Species

Lineodes albicincta E. Hering, 1906
Lineodes aztecalis Hampson, 1913
Lineodes caracasia Amsel, 1956
Lineodes contortalis Guenée, 1854
Lineodes convolutalis Hampson, 1913
Lineodes corinnae Landry, 2016
Lineodes craspediodonta Dyar, 1913
Lineodes dianalis Hampson, 1913
Lineodes elcodes (Dyar, 1910)
Lineodes encystalis Hampson, 1913
Lineodes fontella Walsingham in Hampson, 1913
Lineodes formosalis Amsel, 1956
Lineodes furcillata E. Hering, 1906
Lineodes gracilalis (Herrich-Schäffer, 1871)
Lineodes hamulalis Hampson, 1913
Lineodes hieroglyphalis Guenée, 1854
Lineodes integra (Zeller, 1873)
Lineodes interrupta (Zeller, 1873)
Lineodes latipennis Walsingham in Hampson, 1913
Lineodes leucostrigalis Hampson, 1913
Lineodes longipes (Sepp, 1852)
Lineodes mesodonta Hampson, 1913
Lineodes metagrammalis Möschler, 1890
Lineodes monetalis Dyar, 1913
Lineodes multisignalis Herrich-Schäffer, 1868
Lineodes ochrea Walsingham, 1907
Lineodes peterseni Walsingham in Hampson, 1913
Lineodes polychroalis Hampson, 1913
Lineodes pulcherrima E. Hering, 1906
Lineodes pulchralis Guenée, 1854
Lineodes serpulalis Lederer, 1863
Lineodes tipuloides Walsingham, 1891
Lineodes triangulalis Möschler, 1890
Lineodes tridentalis Hampson, 1913
Lineodes undulata Walsingham in Hampson, 1913
Lineodes venezuelensis Amsel, 1956
Lineodes vulcanalis Landry, 2016
Lineodes vulnifica Dyar, 1913

References

Spilomelinae
Crambidae genera
Taxa named by Achille Guenée